was a Japanese film actor most famous for starring roles in gendaigeki of the silent era.

Career 
Suzuki was born in Tokyo and was a championship swimmer at Meiji University when he first appeared in Souls on the Road in 1921 under the name Zeya Tōgō (東郷是也, a pun on the English "to go there"). After graduating in 1924, he joined the Nikkatsu studio and began acting under his own name. He moved to Shōchiku's Kamata studio the next year and became a major star appearing in youth films often directed by Kiyohiko Ushihara. He also worked with directors such as Kenji Mizoguchi, Minoru Murata, Masahiro Makino, and Yasujirō Shimazu.

He also directed some films and even ran for political office, though unsuccessfully.

Selected filmography 
 Souls on the Road (路上の霊魂, Rojō no reikon) (1921)
 Marching On (進軍, Shingun) (1930)
 The Mountain Pass of Love and Hate (愛憎峠 Aizo toge) (1934)
 Ahen senso (阿片戦争) (1943)

References

External links 

Japanese male film actors
1900 births
1985 deaths
Japanese male silent film actors
Male actors from Tokyo
20th-century Japanese male actors